Artocarpus camansi, the breadnut, is a species of medium-sized tree in the family Moraceae. It is native to New Guinea, the Maluku Islands, and the Philippines.  It is the wild ancestor of the breadfruit (Artocarpus altilis) and is also sometimes known as the seeded breadfruit, to distinguish it from its mostly seedless descendant. Breadnut fruits are edible when cooked. The large seeds can also be roasted and eaten.

History
The species was first described in Flora de Filipinas. Según el sistema sexual de Linneo (1837) by the Spanish friar and botanist Francisco Manuel Blanco from specimens in the Philippines. The specific name is derived from Tagalog kamansi (Philippine Spanish: camansi), a local name for the tree in the islands. 

Other common names for plant include chataigne, castaña 'tropical' (French and Spanish for the unrelated but culinarily similar chestnut), kapiak in New Guinea, katahar in Guyana, kluwih in Indonesia, sukun biji in Malaysia, kos-del (කොස්දෙල් ) in Sri Lanka, pan de fruta in Dominican Republic (Spanish for its relative breadfruit), labapin in Haïti, and pana de pepita in Puerto Rico.

Distribution and origins
Artocarpus camansi is likely endemic to New Guinea, the Maluku Islands, and the Philippines. The ambiguity of the origins of this plant is a result of spread and domestication of multiple species of breadfruit, Artocarpus camansi included, as Austronesian sailors spread from island to island in the Pacific. The breadfruit, Artocarpus altilis, is believed to be a domesticated descendant of Artocarpus camansi which have been selectively bred  by Polynesians to be predominantly seedless.

Habitat and ecology

Morphology, flowers and fruit

The plant is monoecious and the male and female flowers occur at the tips of branches.

Additionally, when ripe, the interior of the fruit is off white with a sweet taste and aroma. The seed of the fruit are normally spread by flying fox and other mammals.

Artocarpus camansi can be distinguished from the closely related Artocarpus altilis by having spinier fruits with numerous seeds. Artocarpus mariannensis can be distinguished by having dark green elongated fruits with darker yellow flesh, as well as entire or shallowly lobed leaves.

Food and economic value
Artocarpus camansi is described as having "high nutritive value but it is an under-utilised food source".
Although not as commonly eaten as the breadfruit, it is an important crop in New Guinea, where the breadnut is a staple crop. Usually the fruit is consumed when it is immature; thinly sliced pieces are boiled in soups.  In the Philippines (along with the related breadfruit, jackfruit, and antipolo) it is commonly cooked with coconut milk and spices and eaten as ginataang kamansi. In South Asia and the Caribbean it is curried and eaten. The seeds are also of economic value in the Caribbean, Central and South America because they taste like chestnuts. As a result, the seeds can be roasted, boiled, canned, or processed into paste, butter, flour or oil.

See also
 Domesticated plants and animals of Austronesia
 Brosimum alicastrum, another plant also commonly known as "breadnut".

References

camansi
Taxa named by Francisco Manuel Blanco